The following article is a summary of notable incidents at the amusement parks and water parks that are operated by Six Flags Entertainment Corporation. In some cases, these incidents occurred while the park was under different management or ownership.

This list is not intended to be a comprehensive list of every such event, but only those that have a significant impact on the parks or park operations, or are otherwise significantly noteworthy. The term incidents refers to major accidents, injuries, or deaths that occur at a park.  While these incidents were required to be reported to regulatory authorities due to where they occurred, they usually fall into one of the following categories:
 Caused by negligence on the part of the guest. This can be a refusal to follow specific ride safety instructions, or deliberate intent to violate park rules.
 The result of a guest's known, or unknown, health issues.
 Negligence on the part of the park, either by ride operator or maintenance safety instructions, or deliberate intent to violate park rules.
 Natural disaster or a generic accident (e.g., lightning strike, slipping and falling), that is not a direct result of an action on anybody's part.

La Ronde

Le Vampire

On July 6, 2012, a 67-year-old employee of the park was killed at Le Vampire. The employee was reportedly found underneath the attraction in a restricted area, appearing to have suffered head trauma.  Park officials stated that the employee had been struck by a roller coaster train. The employee was pronounced dead at the scene; another individual was taken to a hospital to be treated for psychological trauma. Officials with the park did not know why the employee entered the restricted area of the ride while it was operational, but they did state that the ride was operating normally and that procedures for entering restricted ride areas, including notification of ride staff, had not been followed.

Grande Roue
On August 21, 2019, at 7:00 p.m. a film crew was involved in an incident in which two gondolas flipped over and the crew was stuck  in the air. The park was not open to the public at the time. No one was injured. Firefighters rescued the crew within 30 minutes and speculated that the gondolas flipped due to heavy equipment causing instability. The ride remained closed until further inspection deemed it was safe to operate. La Ronde said in a statement "The safety of our guests and employees is our highest priority."

The Mississippi
On July 8, 1979, the Mississippi was involved in a fatal incident when it capsized, dumping 50 to 60 sightseers into the lake. Three of the passengers drowned during the scene and ten were taken to a hospital for further evaluation. Eyewitnesses reported that the boat was returning from a tour when it began to list to one side. Passengers, who were panicking at the time, ran over to the other side and the boat began to lurch from side to side before toppling over less than six meters from the docking area.

Super Manège

On August 25, 2019, a passenger's safety harness malfunctioned when one of the trains began its initial ascent, causing an emergency stop. Safety sensors on the Super Manège stopped the initial climb of the train. This was the ride's final day of operation, and the ride closed earlier than intended. All passengers were evacuated from the area to continue their visit to the park.

Six Flags America

Batwing

On September 22, 2001, a 16-year-old girl was in distress shortly after riding the roller coaster and died after being taken to Prince George's Hospital Center. An autopsy revealed that her death was caused by a pre-existing heart condition.

Harley Quinn: Spinsanity
On June 20, 2021, one of the ride’s supports began to shake, causing an emergency stop of the ride. All riders were evacuated and no injuries were reported. The ride was temporarily closed for investigation, reopening on July 13, 2021.

Hurricane Harbor
 On July 13, 1983, while operating under the name Wild World, 9-year-old boy Christie Davis drowned in the wave pool. Lifeguards reported that the boy appeared to have a seizure, but the Medical Examiner determined there was no seizure.
 On August 20, 1987, a dead prematurely born baby was found abandoned behind the women's changing rooms.
 On July 4, 2005, a 29-year-old woman from Gettysburg, Pennsylvania was found unconscious after coming down the Shark Attack waterslide. She was taken to Bowie Health Center where she later died. It was concluded she had suffered a sudden heart attack during the ride.
 On June 13, 2018, a 14-year-old boy was admitted to the hospital in very critical condition after he was rescued from the wave pool. Park staff and paramedics treated the boy before he was transported to the hospital.
 On August 14, 2021, a young boy slipped and fell into the park's wave pool. Several minutes later, swimmers at the pool discovered the boy, underwater and unconscious, prompting them to notify the lifeguards, who pulled him out and performed CPR. He was reported to be in stable condition at a local hospital, although with serious injuries.

The Joker's Jinx

On August 10, 2014, at about 3 p.m. EST, 24 riders were trapped on the coaster when a train stalled along the course. The train was upright on a curve near one of the highest points on the ride. The local fire department used an aerial fire apparatus to bring down riders one at a time. By 7:30 p.m. EST, all riders had been removed from the ride, which was immediately closed for investigation. Investigators claim that the stalled train was caused by debris on the track. No riders were injured and all were evacuated by emergency personnel.
On April 13, 2017, at a little before 6 p.m. EST, the ride stalled along the same length as the 2014 incident. Several riders were left stuck on the train, and firefighters rescued all of the riders on the coaster with the help of an aerial fire apparatus by 9:20 p.m. EST (more than two hours after the park's closing) and almost four hours after the train stalled.

Octopus
On August 3, 2007, a 6-year-old girl fell from the Octopus while the ride was in motion and suffered minor injuries to her head, hip, and leg. Park officials said that they believe the girl fell because she was standing up while the ride was moving.

Other incidents involving guests
 On July 8, 1997, four young men were stabbed at the park (known as Adventure World at the time). They had come to the aid of a female friend of theirs who had been sexually harassed by a guest named Rasheed Kareem Friday. When her four companions came to her defense, an altercation ensued and Friday stabbed all four. The four victims were taken to the hospital, where one underwent abdominal surgery for his wound.
On September 26, 2014, a 15-year-old boy from Prince George's County, Maryland was severely injured in the parking lot during its annual Fright Fest event after a fight broke out. He was punched twice by someone, fell to the ground in the parking lot, and smashed his head on the concrete. The boy was put into a medically induced coma and taken to a hospital; there, he underwent head surgery in which a portion of his skull was removed so that his swollen brain could expand and heal. Two more people were injured in the incident and were also hospitalized.

Park-wide incidents
 On July 13, 2016, a bomb threat was called in right before the park opened. The Prince George's County Fire Department bomb squad and security personnel were deployed around the park and found two unattended backpacks that were determined not to be explosive. The all-clear was announced after a search of the park around 2:45 p.m. Six Flags announced that the park would be open until 8 p.m. that evening.
 On September 10, 2016, at 1:30 p.m., an unspecified phone threat caused an evacuation of the park, though a security sweep did not detect any suspicious activity. The park remained closed for the remainder of the day, but re-opened as normal the following day.
 On September 25, 2021, multiple fights broke out and videos were circulated online on social media which temporarily resulted in the park closing an hour earlier than expected and officials had to change their normal operational hours for the remainder of the season. Police were still investigating full circumstances of the incident and several victims have filed numerous reports during the time when it took place. No arrests were made.

Renegade Rapids
On June 28, 2000, eight people were trapped when their raft overturned during the ride. All riders escaped but two were injured.

Two Face: The Flip Side
All passengers were examined by paramedics as a safety precaution once they got off, including one person who had an asthma attack and later recovered.
In October 2007, a roller coaster train unintentionally rolled back into the station hitting a pipeline carrying hydraulic fluid which sprayed onto several riders. All suffered minor injuries with 10 people being treated at the scene and two being sent to a local hospital for further evaluation. Following this incident, the roller coaster was closed indefinitely as it did not reopen for the 2008 season and was dismantled a year later in 2009.

Six Flags AstroWorld

Alpine Sleigh Ride
On January 12, 1974, a woman suffered injuries after the car she was in was struck from behind by another car.

Excalibur
 On August 9, 1997, a 51-year-old maintenance worker was killed after being struck by a roller coaster train. He was working on a section of track when the train was sent out for a test run.

Mayan Mindbender
In 2001, a 13-year-old boy was ejected from the ride due to a faulty lap bar and suffered broken bones in his head, pelvis, and legs.

Texas Cyclone
 On August 18, 1977, a 15-year-old girl was injured after falling  from the ride. A park manager claimed that her lap bar might have come undone during the ride.
 On October 19, 2003, seven people were treated and released from a local hospital after a wooden board fell into the middle of a roller coaster train while the ride was running.

Texas Tornado
 On May 10, 1998, a six-car train had nearly reached the top of the first hill when smoke began wafting from the track. The train lost its grip on the tire-driven lift, slid back down the hill into the station, and crashed into a fully occupied train. Seven people went to the hospital and at least two sued after developing neck and back problems.

Six Flags Darien Lake 

On September 6, 2009, the body of a Pennsylvania man, William Sutherland, was found in one of the small lakes located inside of the parking lot. Sutherland had been reported missing the previous day. The cause of his death was not determined.

Mind Eraser
On May 13, 2018, an armrest broke off one of the chairs when the ride was moving. No injuries were reported to any of the guests who were using it. Since then, it has been replaced with a new one.

Predator
On October 5, 2019, a 36-year-old man from Livonia, Michigan suffered shoulder and spinal injuries while riding the coaster when the headrest broke during the ride. The victim claimed the headrest was partially broken prior to his boarding the train and that the attendants failed to notice and close off the seat.

Ride of Steel
The victim sued the park and the ride manufacturer Intamin for negligence, and was awarded $2.85 million following a court case.

 On July 8, 2011, 29-year-old James Hackemer fell to his death from the coaster. The rider, an Iraq War veteran whose legs had been amputated, was in the front row of the roller coaster when he was thrown from the train during the course. Officials decided that operator error was the cause for the accident. The investigators claimed that park workers didn't adhere to rules advertised at the entrance of the ride. The rules required riders to have both legs safely secure when boarding the train. Following this incident, the ride temporarily ceased operation for almost two weeks before reopening again on July 22.

Silver Bullet
On September 30, 2017, several guests on the Silver Bullet suffered injuries as the ride came to a stop. The exact cause is unknown, though a Darien Lake spokesperson said it was not due to a ride malfunction.

Viper
Two other rides at the amusement park were also affected with the fuse.

Six Flags Discovery Kingdom

Animal attacks and deaths
 On January 5, 1996, two trainers were injured by cougars during an exercise session.  One trainer was in the cougar enclosure to take one of the animals for a walk.  The cougars, Zuni and Tonto, had been playing among themselves and began aggressively playing with him, causing severe cuts on his face and upper torso.  The backup trainer suffered minor cuts and bruises in his attempt to free the other.
 On July 31, 1998, Kuma, a two-year-old Bengal tiger, attacked and seriously injured a guest from San Jose, California, and slightly injured the trainer.  The incident happened in a secluded area of the park set up to do private photo sessions with the big cats.  The tiger was apparently startled when the guest fell off the photo platform and landed on top of her.  The trainer suffered a clawing while trying to free the guest, who had received serious injuries to her head and upper torso.
 On June 2, 2004, a 23-year-old African elephant named Misha gored her trainer with her tusks while in her enclosure as the trainer walked beside her.  This was Misha's second aggressive act following a previous swipe at a trainer two years prior.
On September 5, 2007, a two-year-old giraffe died after a fire broke out overnight and its enclosure was destroyed. The animal was accompanied by two more who escaped. Investigators believed the fire was caused by an electrical short.

Batman Water Thrill Spectacular Show
On June 6, 1999, a 38-year-old stuntman was injured while doing a performance, after being thrown off a jet ski and was hit on the head by another one that was coming towards him. He was taken to John Muir Medical Center by helicopter for treatment of a small cut to his head.

Boomerang
On August 25, 1999, 28 passengers were stranded on the Boomerang ride for several hours. After the train was pulled out of the station, the pull truck failed to release the train and it stopped on the initial incline for about ten minutes. While operators were attempting to restart the ride, the cable that pulled the train out of the station and was holding it on the hill snapped. The train proceeded through the station and into the first element with the pull truck and part of the cable still attached. Due to the extra weight and the fact that the pull truck was not designed to negotiate turns, the train came to halt in the boomerang element. Riders, suffering from cases of severe dehydration and sunburn, were rescued and treated by firefighters in an aerial fire apparatus.

Monkey Business
On July 21, 2001, a 42-year-old woman suffered a brain hemorrhage after riding the attraction. She was treated by the park's medical staff, taken to Kaiser Hospital and died two days later from her injuries. An autopsy wasn't performed to determine the exact cause of her death. State investigators temporarily shut down the ride, but later reopened after no mechanical problems were reported.

Other incidents involving guests
On July 3, 2010, one of the parking lot trams hit a swinging metal gate after someone accidentally pushed it which resulted in three people becoming injured at the scene. A 34-year-old man and his 2-year-old son were both taken to the hospital while another suffered minor injuries.
On August 25, 2018, a fight broke out inside the park between five people, who were all arrested for causing a disturbance.  A police officer suffered minor injuries.

Scat-a-bout
On September 4, 1999, a nine-year-old boy was injured when he slipped below the restraining bar on the Scat-a-bout, a scrambler ride.  The boy was thrown from the ride and landed in a nearby planter, receiving cuts on his legs.  The park later stated that the accident was the result of the boy intentionally sliding beneath the safety restraint.

Starfish
 On May 12, 2001, a 41-year-old woman from Antioch, California was thrown from the ride when a restraining bar failed as the result of a pneumatic valve being incorrectly installed. She landed on the pavement and suffered head and knee injuries.  Her later lawsuit named both the park and ride manufacturer Chance Rides as responsible parties.
 On June 8, 2002, a 4-year-old girl was critically injured when she slipped beneath the restraining bar and fell from the Starfish ride while riding with her mother, receiving critical head injuries. Investigators later blamed park employees for incorrectly seating the girl and not having proper signage indicating the proper seating arrangement for a larger and smaller rider.

Six Flags Fiesta Texas

On July 8, 2000, seven people were injured after a chlorine spill. They were all taken to local hospitals and released without any serious injuries.

Other incidents involving guests
On July 11, 2007, a 37-year-old man was charged with improper photography and recording after allegedly acting suspiciously with a video camera by secretly filming young girls in the water park section. Reports have said he was trying to film someone without permission in an attempt to arouse or gratify the sexual desire of a person.

Poltergeist
Family members stated that she may have fainted due to the heat of the day.
 On August 28, 2010, two people were stuck on the Poltergeist for two hours.
 On May 29, 2021, at approximately 11:54 AM, the San Antonio Fire Department was called to safely evacuate 20 riders when Poltergeist got stuck for three hours on the same location prior to the 2010 incident. According to SAFD's public information officer Joe Arrington, there have been no injuries reported and by 3:15 PM, all the passengers had been safely rescued.

Frontier City

Mystery River Log Flume
On June 14, 2002, three people were injured on the ride when two boats bumped into each other. The three, all from Ada, Oklahoma, were taken to St. Anthony Hospital and treated in the emergency room. The Emergency Medical Systems Authority was called at about 9 p.m. to respond after the riders complained of back and neck injuries.
On June 23, 2019, a woman suffered back injuries while riding on the log flume. She slid backwards and hit herself on a pole. A park spokesperson said that the ride's vehicle was already inspected and found to be operating normally.

Silver Bullet
On May 4, 2017, firefighters rescued 19 passengers after they were stuck on the roller coaster. No injuries were reported.

Wildcat

On June 21, 2019, two riders were injured as a falling tree branch toppled on top of them while on the coaster. One of them was taken to a nearby hospital while the other was treated for minor injuries. The ride remained closed following an investigation and later reopened.
On July 26, 2021, a man trespassed through a restricted area by climbing on the catwalk next to the wooden supports of the coaster's tracks to bring bottled water to passengers on board a train when it stalled on the lift hill. According to a statement provided by the park, his actions were unsafe and unwarranted and he and his family were escorted out of the park, with him being banned afterwards.

Six Flags Great Adventure

Batman and Robin: The Chiller
Another incident on the ride occurred in May of that same year as it malfunctioned when one of the ride's 200 electric motors began smoking and was shut down temporarily for 45 minutes.
 On June 2, 2006, two cars on the original Robin train were damaged as a wheel bogie on the third car suffered a mechanical malfunction. No one was hurt in the accident and passengers had to be evacuated. The coaster was closed for the rest of the 2006 season. In 2007, the zero-g rolls were removed from both sides and the Batman train was repainted red. The Robin side would reopen on April 7, 2007, but a second wheel bogie malfunction would occur on June 28. The ride was shut down because of this. Instead of spending more money to fix the ride which had constant issues, Six Flags decided that the Chiller's time in the park had come to an end. The cost to fix the ride would not be worth it and they could not be confident in its ability to operate consistently. The coaster was swiftly dismantled in the fall of 2007.

Congo Rapids
On August 20, 1998, eight people suffered minor injuries after a rope underneath the raft was caught on an object, thus making it suddenly stop.
On July 15, 2012, a goose was trapped in the ride's conveyor belt. Park staff stopped the belt to prevent the rafts from going any further, but the goose was killed instantly once the ride continued to operate.

El Diablo
On September 13, 2015, a girl from Gibbstown, New Jersey was injured when her safety restraints came undone as the ride started. As she exited the ride, it was shut down for technical difficulties. Two years later in 2017, her family filed a lawsuit to the park claiming that the staff didn't check them before they were secure. The ride is no longer at the park, but was relocated to La Ronde for the 2019 season.

El Toro
On August 19, 2016, a woman was injured after being struck in the face by an unknown object while riding the coaster. She was treated by the park medical staff before being taken to a local hospital for further evaluation. The attraction re-opened the next day after park officials fully inspected the ride to make sure that it was running safely.
On June 29, 2021, a train partially derailed when the rear car's up-stop wheels, which are designed to prevent the train from lifting off the track, moved out of place and up onto the track. The train came to a stop just short of the final brake run, where the riders were safely evacuated. No one was injured in the accident. The cause of the accident was not immediately clear, and the ride remained closed pending the outcome of an investigation. The ride reopened on April 2, 2022, opening day of the 2022 season.
On August 25, 2022, 13 riders reported back pain and other minor injuries after riding the coaster. Of these, 5 were hospitalized and all 5 were released shortly after. Those injured complained of increased roughness at the bottom of the third drop - the ride completed its cycle and was closed for inspection. In a statement, the park said that the ride will be completely re-inspected by a third party maintenance team and the state of New Jersey prior to reopening.

Employee/guest incidents
On March 31, 1986, three parkgoers were stabbed in two separate incidents including an attempted robbery inside the park.
On April 19, 1987, an unidentified gunman fired several shots into a crowd on the plaza inside the main gate, wounding one man and sending panicked guests running for safety. It was the third violent incident of the day, following two earlier unrelated stabbings.  The park was evacuated a few minutes after the shooting, about an hour earlier than its scheduled 8:00 p.m. closing time.  Park officials modified security after the incident, including adding metal detectors at the park's entrance.
On July 14, 1987, a 32-year-old female worker from Plumsted Township, New Jersey suffered a fractured vertebra when a camel knocked her down. She remained in fair condition at Freehold Area Hospital.
On September 1, 2017, a 19-year-old male worker was struck by a lift truck as he was stringing lights near a park fountain. He was taken to the hospital and later died from his injuries.
On August 29, 2021, a woman entered a restricted area and suffered injuries to her leg after slipping off a rooftop as stated by a park spokesperson. She was taken to a local hospital for further evaluation. The incident occurred in a fenced off area between the Kingda Ka and Zumanjaro: Drop of Doom rides, both of which were temporarily shut down while the issue was addressed.

Haunted Castle
On May 11, 1984, eight teenage visitors were trapped in the Haunted Castle attraction, and died when it was destroyed by fire.  Six Flags Great Adventure and its parent company Six Flags were subsequently indicted for aggravated manslaughter, accused of recklessly causing the deaths by taking inadequate precautions against a fire.  In the subsequent trial, the prosecution argued that repeated warnings by safety consultants to install sprinklers or smoke alarms had been ignored.  The defendants denied any culpability, and contended that the fire was arson and that no precautions would have saved lives.  The trial jury found the defendants not guilty. A light bulb had burned out in one of the rooms of the attraction, and a 14-year-old boy lit a cigarette lighter to find his way through the darkness. The flame ignited some foam rubber padding which was used to protect people from bumping into a wall. A fire resulted, which quickly spread throughout the 17-trailer structure with the help of extremely flammable building materials. The fire eventually engulfed and totally destroyed the attraction.

Hurricane Harbor

In August 2015, Tolyndra Pierre from Brooklyn, New York was celebrating her 20th birthday at the park. She broke her ankle while riding the King Cobra waterslide with a friend using a double tube, which was prohibited on that particular slide. Each rider also exceeded the 200-pound weight limit for single riders. As a result of the excessive weight, the raft slammed into the snake's mouth at the top of the uphill portion. She sued the park in 2016 for negligence, demanding $3 million. The waterslide was closed in 2017 and never re-opened. It was dismantled in 2018.
On July 19, 2021, the main entrance to the Hurricane Harbor water park was temporarily shut down for several hours due to a routine safety check. Officials states that the incident was reported to be as a false alarm and the park was reopened.
On September 6, 2021, a guest was taken to the hospital complaining of back and neck pain after riding the Tornado waterslide.

The Joker
 In June 2016, a Philadelphia man received multiple injuries to his foot and knee while riding, when his leg struck a bar attached to the coaster. The victim sued the park for negligence in May 2018.
 On November 15, 2018, a girl's mother from Camden, New York filed another lawsuit regarding the same ride at the park. She claimed that her daughter, who was on a class trip to the park, was waiting in line to ride the coaster when a wayward metal washer weighing  and measuring  fell from the ride, injuring her left shoulder.
In August 2019, a paraplegic man who had a spinal cord injury was grievously injured when his legs became unsecured during the ride, causing him to land onto the restraining bar multiple times. A lawsuit was filed on August 6, 2021.
On July 14, 2021, a 7-year-old boy suffered head injuries while riding the coaster and was taken to a nearby hospital for evaluation. The coaster was temporarily shut down for inspection, but was found to be operating normally.

Kingda Ka

On June 8, 2005, a bolt failed inside a trough that the launch cable travels through. This caused the liner to come loose, creating friction on the cable and preventing the train from accelerating to the correct speed. The rubbing of the cable against the inside of the metal trough caused sparks and shards of metal to fly out from the bottom of the train. The ride was closed for almost two months following the incident, but later reopened on August 4.
On July 26, 2012, a 12-year-old boy from Howell Township, New Jersey was struck in the face by a bird while riding the roller coaster. He suffered minor injuries and was taken to a nearby hospital.
In May 2018, when a man exited the attraction, he suffered serious injuries after stepping on a piece of bamboo which went through his shoe, penetrating through the sole of his right foot. Before he could ride, he was told by someone that no loose articles or objects could be brought into the attraction and a park employee told him he could leave his cellphone under some foliage in a nearby bamboo grove during the time of his ride. A lawsuit was then filed for the injuries he sustained.
On August 28, 2018, a 43-year-old woman from Marlboro Township, New Jersey claimed that her left shoulder strap became unlatched during the ride. The ride was temporarily out of service the next day before the harness was eventually repaired and put back in place.
On May 29, 2019, a man who was apparently a doctor from Red Bank, New Jersey filed a lawsuit against the park and claimed that he became injured after riding the roller coaster with his son back in 2017. He suffered a spinal cord injury.

Lightnin' Loops
On June 17, 1987, a 19-year-old woman from Chester, Pennsylvania was killed after falling from the Lightnin' Loops shuttle loop roller coaster. An investigation by the State Labor Department concluded that the ride itself was operating properly, but that the ride operator started the ride without checking that all of the passengers were securely fastened by the safety harnesses. The Department's Office of Safety Compliance further concluded that the accident would not have occurred if proper procedures had been followed.  The park was found to be in violation of the Carnival/Amusement Ride Safety Act and was subsequently charged with the maximum state fine of $1,000.

Nitro
On July 11, 2021, the roller coaster was temporarily shut down for inspection after a guest reported that a safety bar unfastened on one of the trains.

Parachuter's Perch
On April 28, 1985, two passengers were left stranded on one of the parachutes for more than an hour as its weight was moving too slow and hit another cable nearby. The weight that malfunctioned apparently didn't reach one of the devices in time for it to respond. According to park officials, the malfunction was not reported to have been serious, but the ride was shut down temporarily after safety inspections were made for it to re-open.
In May 2019, a woman from Williamstown, New Jersey suffered facial injuries when a park worker accidentally raised the ride's security bar too high which led to her having a fractured nose and a portion of her ear being removed. A lawsuit was filed two years later on June 9, 2021, in response to the injuries she sustained in the accident.

Rolling Thunder
On August 16, 1981, a 20-year-old park employee from Middletown Township, New Jersey fell to his death from the Rolling Thunder roller coaster during a routine test run.  An investigation by the New Jersey Labor Department concluded that the man may not have secured himself with the safety bar.  A park representative later confirmed this conclusion, saying that the employee "may have assumed an unauthorized riding position that did not make use of safety restraints."  The ride was inspected, and the Labor Department concluded that the ride was "operationally and mechanically sound."
On August 29, 1981, a 19-year-old woman from Philadelphia, Pennsylvania was found to have been slumped over in her seat when the train returned to the station. She was taken to Freehold Area Hospital where she was pronounced dead after arrival. An autopsy revealed that she choked to death from aspiration of gastric contents during the time when riding the coaster.
On May 7, 1983, six people were injured when a coaster train failed to stop at the loading platform and collided with another that was heading up the lift. The ride was modified a year later in order to prevent the train from entering the station until the one ahead of it cleared the lift.
On August 6, 1990, a 19-year-old man from New Providence, New Jersey suffered severe injuries and remained in critical condition at CentraState Medical Center after falling  from the ride. Police and park officials claimed that he and another person that were both on board the train they were sitting in tried to stand up when it curved around part of its track. The ride remained closed until being fully inspected by state officials to make sure that it was up and running again as usual.

Runaway Mine Train
On August 28, 1977, a train collided into another one that was at the station, causing 14 people to be injured. Of all the people that were hurt in the accident, one had to be hospitalized. When the ride finally reopened after already being checked for inspection beforehand, only one of the coaster's trains was running.

Sarajevo Bobsled
On July 22, 1987, a 33-year-old man from Binghamton, New York suffered injuries to his leg when a park employee started and stopped the ride when he noticed he was still boarding the train.

Saw Mill: Log Flume
On June 13, 2021, two riders were taken to a local hospital after a boat nearly tipped sideways. Several passengers were treated by first aid staff and the ride closed for inspection and evaluation.

Skyride
On August 16, 1977, a 24-year-old mechanic who was trying to repair the ride got caught in the drive wheel when one of the cars suddenly began to move. He later died from the injuries sustained in the accident.

Six Flags Great America

From 2004 to September 2007, the Occupational Safety and Health Administration (OSHA) inspected Six Flags parks five different times and found a total of four violations. On September 10, 2007, OSHA cited Great America with 38 safety violations, alleging "multiple serious and repeat violations at the amusement park, ranging from defective emergency brakes on an industrial truck to a lack of labeling procedures for preventing inadvertent machine start-ups." OSHA fined the park US$117,700.

American Eagle
On September 9, 1984, three guests were hospitalized after two trains collided in the station.
On September 7, 1997, four guests were slightly injured after the second and third cars on the blue train separated and collided into the brake run.
On May 22, 2002, an 11-year-old girl from Glenview, Illinois suffered a traumatic brain hemorrhage after riding on the coaster. She was taken to  Glenbrook Hospital in Glenview late that night, then transferred to Children's Memorial Hospital in Chicago, Illinois where she underwent brain surgery. She was then in a coma for about four days, and stayed in the hospital for two weeks before her release.

Antoine's Ice Cream Parlor
On October 12, 2008, a park employee dressed up as a werewolf suddenly lost balance while walking on stilts and fell through a window inside the park's restaurant, injuring a guest who was standing nearby the window. The victim was taken to a nearby hospital treated for injuries and later released. The employee was not injured.

Cajun Cliffhanger
On July 19, 2000, a 12-year-old girl from McHenry, Illinois suffered two crushed toes after the floor of the ride was improperly raised prior to the ride coming to a complete stop.  A second guest also had her foot trapped in this accident. The ride was permanently shut down as part of an out-of-court settlement. In the ten years prior to this accident, there were thirteen other reported incidents involving the Cajun Cliffhanger ride, at least six of which involved injuries.

Demon
On July 13, 1993, a train collided at slow speed with another one at the station, causing injuries to eight people. All of them were treated at local hospitals. After the incident, the ride remained closed the next day following an investigation from the park staff and the fire department and re-opened a day later.
On April 18, 1998, 23 riders were stranded upside down in the middle of the ride's second vertical loop.  Firefighters used an aerial fire apparatus to bring riders to safety, although some were on the ride for as long as three hours.  The incident was the result of a mechanical failure.

The Edge
On May 22, 1984, three teenage boys were seriously injured when the ride vehicle fell back down the lift shaft.

Grand Music Hall 

 On April 2, 2014, at around 9pm, a fire broke out in the back of the Grand Music Hall theater. No injuries were reported and minimal damage was sustained to the backstage area, though damages were evaluated at a total of $32,000.

Lawsuits 

 In 2019, Six Flags faced a lawsuit that went to the Illinois Supreme Court over Great America's collection of biometric data, including fingerprint scans, from its guests. Stacy Rosenbach sued the park after her teenage son was asked to provide a thumbprint scan during a 2014 field trip. In the case of Rosenbach v. Six Flags Entm't Corp, the park and its owners were found to be in violation of Illinois' Biometric Information Privacy Act.The class action lawsuit over the use of fingerprint scanners at the park entrance in the case of Rosenbach v. Six Flags Enm't Corp was settled for $36 million on June 12. Each guest would receive $200 if they visited the park between October 2013 through December 31, 2018. A final hearing was on October 29.

Other incidents involving guests
On September 23, 2017, at around 9pm during the park's annual Fright Fest event, a family from Batavia, Illinois was hospitalized with non-life-threatening injuries when they were attacked by several teenagers. All nine of the teens were arrested by police at the scene.
On June 13, 2021, multiple sources claim that four people suffered injuries and a suspect reportedly used pepper spray on a crowd of people as numerous fights broke out inside the park. The people who were involved in the fight were treated by paramedics, including one victim who sustained a significant laceration and required stitches.
On June 27, 2021, a man was reportedly knocked unconscious during a fight that occurred inside the park Sunday evening and was seen convulsing on the ground near the X-Flight ride. The Gurnee police and fire department were called to the scene and the victim was then transported to Advocate Condell Medical Center in Libertyville, Illinois.
On July 19, 2022, a 32-year-old man from Chicago, Illinois, was arrested after the man shoved a police officer and resisted arrest while the officer was trying to control an altercation between adults and children.

An incident occurred on August 14, 2022, when unknown assailants shot three people in a drive-by shooting at the park's parking lot in a white sedan, with initial reports suggesting there was an active shooter inside the park. The incident had occurred near park closing, and all guests were evacuated. Gurnee police had stated that the shooting was not a random act, and was a targeted shooting. All victims suffered non-life-threatening injuries. Two of the victims were transported to Advocate Condell Medical Center in Libertyville, Illinois; both were released from the hospital the following day.

Pizza Orleans
On January 22, 1999, the entire Pizza Orleans fast-food restaurant was destroyed by a fire. The flames threatened the adjacent Royale Theater, but firefighters were able to prevent it from spreading. The restaurant was declared a total loss and damages were estimated at $125,000.

Ragin' Cajun
On May 29, 2004, Jack E Brouse, a 52-year-old ride mechanic from Zion, Illinois, was struck by a roller-coaster car as he attempted to cross the tracks resulting in traumatic head injury. He died several days later at Froedtert Hospital in Milwaukee.

Raging Bull
 On May 3, 2003, 11-year-old Erica Emmons from Gary, Indiana, collapsed after riding the Raging Bull coaster while on a trip with her sisters, cousins and aunt. She died after being taken to St. Therese Hospital. While initial reports said that she died from choking on chewing gum she had been chewing while on the ride, the coroner's report later stated that she died due to cardiomegaly, and had been seeing a cardiologist for treatment.

Splashwater Falls
On March 11, 2008, a 46-year-old man from Pleasant Prairie, Wisconsin fell  from the ride during demolition. He suffered head and chest trauma and was later pronounced dead after being taken to Advocate Condell Medical Center.

Sprocket Rockets
On August 16, 2006, a 10-year-old girl from Arlington Heights, Illinois, collapsed and died after riding the Spacely's Sprocket Rockets roller coaster in the Camp Cartoon Network area. An autopsy showed that she died of a congenital heart anomaly.  Her family said that she had a history of the anomaly.

Superman: Ultimate Flight
On September 9, 2017, 50-year-old Scott Barnes from Andersonville, Indiana died after riding the flying roller coaster. Exiting the attraction, the man complained of feeling sick, then collapsed on the ramp. He was taken to nearby Advocate Condell Medical Center, where he later died from what was termed a "natural death".

Viper
On June 25, 1997, a 14-year-old Waukegan boy injured his arm while dangling it outside the car. His limb got caught between the car and the platform as the ride reentered the station and slowed to a stop.

Whizzer
During a 1980 investigation of an accident at the Great America park in California of their Willard's Whizzer coaster, the U.S. Consumer Product Safety Commission discovered two incidents at the Illinois park that had not been previously reported:  on July 24, 1976, 13 guests were injured; and on August 18, 1976, 18 guests were injured.  The CPSC report does not list injury or accident details for either incident

Hurricane Harbor Chicago

Hurricane Bay 
On June 29, 2005, a 68-year-old guest from the South Maplewood section of Chicago, Illinois, had a heart attack and died in the wave pool.

Wahoo Racer 
On June 2, 2017, a woman filed a lawsuit against the park saying that she was injured while riding the Wahoo Racer waterslide back in July 2011. She suffered cuts and torn ligaments to her wrist and hands after riding and was taken to a nearby hospital to have surgery on her left hand. A court upheld $1.5 million for the case.

Six Flags Great Escape

Sky Ride
The girl had slipped under the chair's safety bar while the ride was in motion. The ride was stopped when park visitors alerted the operators to the incident, while other visitors gathered underneath the girl to prepare to catch her. She ultimately fell into the group of visitors below her. One of these visitors, an unidentified 47-year-old man, injured his back in the process. The passenger received no serious injuries and was taken to Albany Medical Center. Park officials stated that there did not appear to be a malfunction of the ride, but closed the ride pending review. The ride later reopened, with added restraints to prevent any future accidents.

Hurricane Harbor SplashTown

On April 12, 2019, a worker fell to his death from a structure. Authorities ruled it as an accident.
On July 17, 2021, over 60 people were decontaminated after being exposed to an airborne chemical leak inside the water park. 26 people were treated at local hospitals including a 3-year-old who was in severe condition. Following this incident, the water park was temporarily closed for the remainder of the day as a safety precaution.

Six Flags Hurricane Harbor Concord

 On June 2, 1997, the Banzai Pipeline suffered a catastrophic failure after a section of the slide collapsed under the weight of a group of over 30 students who had congregated in a section of the slide, resulting in the students falling from the destroyed section. 32 people were injured, and one of the students died.

Guest altercations
On July 13, 2019, a man from Stockton, California suffered severe injuries after being shot outside of the water park's parking lot following a parking dispute with a 28-year-old man from Oakland, California. The victim was taken to a hospital in Walnut Creek, while the suspect was arrested by Concord police.

Six Flags Hurricane Harbor Rockford

Splash Blaster
In July 2014, a dozen lawsuits were filed against the park and the Rockford Park District after many guests complained of suffering spinal and back injuries while on the ride. All of the lawsuits were settled for $2.53 million. The ride was removed in September 2015 following these incidents.

Six Flags Magic Mountain

On April 18, 1993, 40 people were treated for minor injuries and 16 of them were taken to two different hospitals after a massive brawl occurred inside of the park against several youths who went on a rampage during a TLC and Paperboy concert at the park. No one was arrested by the police during the scene, but the park had to close earlier than expected.
In 2006, there were 109 complaints by Magic Mountain guests due to various incidents, according to an annual report from the Amusement Safety Organization. Reports ranged from nosebleeds and heat exhaustion, to neck and back injuries from various rides. Included in those 109 complaints were 18 reports of people blacking out on the Goliath roller coaster. Other complaints were safety-related, such as notices of ride operators talking on cell phones while operating rides.  The report stated that the state of California received notice of 80 injuries at Magic Mountain between January 2001 and December 2006.
On June 9, 2019, at around noon, guests had to evacuate after the park was forced to close early due to a brush fire and heavy smoke surrounding around the main area and its water park. Firefighters were also called into the park at the time when it occurred. No damage was reported, and the park re-opened the following day.

Batman: The Ride
On May 2, 1999, a 17-year-old boy suffered near-fatal stab wounds in the ride's queue by a 33-year-old man from Duarte, California and his 23-year-old girlfriend. The incident occurred as he was trying to meet up with some of his friends while cutting in line to approach them. He was taken to Henry Mayo Newhall Medical Center where he was listed in serious condition according to The Los Angeles County Sheriff. The couple who stabbed him were taken into custody at the Santa Clarita Sheriff's Station on suspicion of attempted murder with the bail being set at $500,000.

Colossus/Twisted Colossus
On December 26, 1978, 20-year-old Carol Flores died after falling out of the ride. The lap bar was locked in place but it proved to be ineffective, due to the woman's obesity. This incident prompted Colossus to be closed for a year while the trains were replaced and other adjustments were made. One of the old cars has been sent to the Sky Tower.
On June 6, 1993, one of the coaster's trains rear-ended another that was parked inside the station which resulted in seven riders suffering minor injuries. They were taken to Henry Mayo Newhall Memorial Hospital, and later released. The coaster was temporarily shut down in order for the brakes on the tracks to be adjusted, plus safety tests were made to make sure it was operating normally as usual.
On September 8, 2014, a fire broke out atop Colossus's lift hill. The ride had already been closed for conversion into Twisted Colossus, and no injuries or deaths were reported. The fire was caused by welders working on removing track.
On July 7, 2022, an 8-year-old girl received ten stitches on her forehead at a nearby hospital after she was hit in the face by a cellphone while riding.

Eagle's Flight
On February 5, 1978, a gondola car on Eagle's Flight traveling the Galaxy course fell  to the ground. A newlywed couple were violently rocking the car back and forth, causing it to detach from the cable. The husband was killed, and his wife suffered serious injuries, including losing her legs.

Full Throttle
On July 10, 2021, a person suffered minor injuries after getting their foot lodged between the coaster's cars and the station platform. Park staff responded immediately to the incident and the victim was safely removed from the ride, then transported to a local hospital for further evaluation.

Goliath
On June 2, 2001,  28-year-old Pearl Santos died of a brain aneurysm while riding Goliath.  Her family sued the park, claiming that managers were aware of other complaints from Goliath riders and continued to operate the coaster anyway.

Hurricane Harbor
On September 15, 2001, a 25-year-old man was arrested after falsely reporting a bomb threat when he told a park employee that he left a stick of dynamite inside one of the lockers. The incident resulted in over 2,000 park visitors being evacuated from the property.
On September 30, 2012, a 19-year-old man fell from the Venom Drop water slide. According to a spokesperson for the water park, the man cut in line at the slide, fought through the lifeguards, and jumped onto the slide head-first. The man tumbled onto the slide and slipped over the edge, falling  onto a fence below the slide tower. The local sheriff's office reported that the man was transported to an area hospital with life-threatening injuries.

Ninja
On August 30, 2008, 20-year-old Carlos Ibanez was hospitalized after being hit by the train and knocked unconscious when he allegedly climbed multiple security fences to retrieve a hat. Airlifted to the UCLA Medical Center, he was pronounced dead at 2 a.m. the following day, due to blunt force trauma.
On July 7, 2014, 22 guests were stranded for over two hours after a tree branch fell which caused the first car of the train to derail from the coaster's tracks. Four of the 22 guests were injured, but none serious enough to require a hospital visit. The ride reopened 12 days later on July 19.

Revolution
On July 18, 1978, the braking system on the coaster malfunctioned which caused the train to go  backwards on the ride's lift hill when it was up the  incline of its midpoint. Of the 22 people that were on board the ride, 10 of them suffered injuries and were taken to Henry Mayo Newhall Memorial Hospital for treatment. The ride had already been inspected earlier that morning with no mechanical problems during its test runs.
On May 30, 1996, 25-year-old park attendant Cherie La Motte of Valencia, California was killed while crossing the tracks in the roller coaster's station. She slipped and fell into a shallow pit beneath the tracks and was struck by a train that was pulling into the station.
On June 13, 2015, 10-year-old Jasmine Martinez who was riding the roller coaster was found unconscious but breathing after returning to the ride's station. She died the following day at nearby Northridge Hospital. A coroner's report said the girl died from natural causes unrelated to the ride itself as an autopsy wasn't performed to determine the exact cause of her death, as requested by her parents.

Scream
On April 9, 2004, 21-year-old park employee Bantita Rackchamroon died after being struck by the roller coaster while underneath the track during a test run prior to the park's opening that day.  The roller coaster was allowed to be re-opened the next week after an OSHA inspection found no mechanical issues.

Tidal Wave
On May 20, 1990, one of the ride's boats became stuck on the top of the lift hill, which then caused the two boats to collide with each other after the splashdown. The collision resulted in minor cuts and bruises to six passengers. A seventh passenger, a nine-year-old boy who bumped his head, was sent to Henry Mayo Newhall Memorial Hospital for observation and then released.

Wonder Woman: Flight of Courage
On October 31, 2022, a 9-year-old girl was struck in the face with a cell phone that flew from another rider. The girl was scarred by the phone and her family pushed Six Flags to be more strict on loose articles aboard their attractions.

Six Flags México

On June 8, 2014, around 10 a.m., a fire broke out in a warehouse of stuffed animals. Injured men and women were evacuated, leaving a 500-meter area affected. It has been established that the cause of the fire was due to a short circuit. At the time of the fire, the park was closed.

Six Flags New England

Blizzard River
On August 7, 1999, eight riders suffered injuries when their raft flipped over, trapping them underneath the water.

Cyclone
On July 8, 1983, a 19-year-old rider was ejected from the roller coaster during the course of the ride after his seatbelt unfastened. A mechanical inspection was performed and no problems were found with the ride; it reopened the following day. The rider suffered a fractured pelvis.
On September 3, 1983, a train filled with riders collided into the back of another train which was leaving the station. Five passengers were injured and were treated at local hospitals. No mechanical problems were found and operator error was ruled the cause.
On May 2, 1999, one of the trains stalled between the second and third hills. The second hill on the Cyclone was reprofiled and the incident occurred a day after the park began to run with two trains on the coaster for the first time in 15 years.

Goliath
On July 11, 2016, a malfunction occurred on one of the ride's cables. The coaster was not in operation at the time when the incident occurred, but was temporarily shut down in order for the cable to be fully replaced by a new one.

Houdini's Great Escape
 On October 9, 2010, Houdini's Great Escape (which was being used as a haunted house called Midnight Mansion), which was available during Fright Fest, suspiciously caught on fire. Firefighters were called to extinguish the flames, but the ride was closed for the rest of the night and the following day. Investigations showed that a flammable cobweb hanging on the top of the building was the cause of the fire after coming in close contact with a light fixture. Nearly  of cobweb burned up, and the building only suffered minor damages to the roof and exterior. No one was injured, but damages were estimated at $5,000.

Other incidents involving guests
On June 2, 2017, a group of people who were on a class trip visiting the amusement park suffered injuries when the tram they were riding hydroplaned in the parking lot after a rainstorm, resulting in guests being tossed around. Two students were reported to have concussions according to the school's superintendent. Five of them were taken to the hospital for evaluation.

Superman: The Ride
 On August 6, 2001, one of the trains failed to stop at the ride's brake run, colliding with the other train in the loading station. 22 people were taken to hospitals with minor injuries, and 1 with critical injuries. The ride reopened twelve days later on August 18, 2001.
 On May 1, 2004, 55-year-old Stanley Mordarsky from Bloomfield, Connecticut fell out of his coaster seat during the last turn and was killed.  Reports show that the ride attendant had not checked that the guest's ride restraint was secure  as his girth was too large for the T-bar-shaped ride restraint to close properly.  The victim's family said that due to his various medical conditions, such as cerebral palsy, he shouldn't have been allowed to ride.  The park stated that the federal Americans with Disabilities Act forbids them from denying a ride to a person with a disability as long as the person can get on the ride unassisted.

Thunderbolt
On June 25, 1995, the red train failed to stop in the station and collided with the blue train which had already started to climb the lift. According to the Hartford Courant, nine people were treated and released at area hospitals. Human error was cited as the cause of the accident; this marked the last time that two trains operated on the coaster.

Twisted Train
On August 2, 2000, a 12-year-old boy from Amherst, New York appeared to have trouble breathing after exiting the ride. He was pronounced dead after being taken to Baystate Medical Center in Springfield, Massachusetts shortly before 8pm. The incident was not related to the ride itself but the child did suffer a pre-existing medical condition at the time while he was on the coaster.

Six Flags New Orleans

Joker's Jukebox
On July 10, 2003, a 52-year-old grandmother was strapping her 4-year-old grandson in when the ride started up. She later died at Lakeland Hospital from blunt-force internal injuries after being struck by a ride vehicle. The park added mirrors to the ride for ride operators to view around the blind spot where the accident occurred, and then introduced a safety announcement which notified the guests that the ride was about to start.

Six Flags Over Georgia

Batman: The Ride
 On May 26, 2002, a 58-year-old Six Flags foreman was struck in the head and killed by the dangling legs of a passenger after he wandered into the ride's path after entering a locked, no-access area during the ride's operation. The passenger, a 14-year-old girl, was hospitalized with leg injuries and released.
 On June 28, 2008, a 17-year-old male from Springfield, South Carolina, was decapitated by the passing train after he climbed over two six-foot fences and entered a restricted area.  Reports said that the victim was trying to retrieve his lost hat. Additional eyewitnesses stated that the victim and a companion, who also entered the restricted area but was uninjured, were trying to take a shortcut back into the park after leaving the park for lunch.

Georgia Cyclone
On August 29, 1990, a 31-year-old woman from Duluth, Georgia, claimed to have broken her neck while riding the coaster. She was taken to Gwinnett Medical Center by ambulance where she was reported to be in stable condition. Park officials temporarily shut down the ride for 45 minutes for inspection.

Goliath
On July 27, 2006, a 45-year-old male from Birmingham, Alabama, died of a heart attack after riding Goliath. He was alert during the ride but was unconscious when the train arrived at the loading platform.  An autopsy showed that the man had a congenital heart condition, and it was expected that the medical examiner would announce that he died of natural causes.  Goliath was closed for two hours for an inspection, but was found to be operating normally.

Great Air Racer
On May 27, 1984, four passengers were injured after a computer malfunction caused the ride's cables to drop the planes out of position.

Hurricane Harbor
On May 29, 2014, opening day, a 14-year-old girl fell ill while using the park's wave pool. Guests had to be evacuated off the area after it smelled strongly of chlorine and was temporarily shut down for inspection once additional chemicals were added. The girl died, possibly unrelated to this incident, at Egleston Children's Hospital on July 18, 2014 after she had difficulty breathing for nearly two months.

Log Jamboree
On August 7, 1984, a 17-year-old park worker was pulled from the water after falling  from the attraction. The victim, who suffered a  mild concussion and lacerations, was taken to Parkway Regional Hospital.

Other incidents involving guests
On March 6, 2021, a 2-year-old boy was fatally struck by a car in the parking lot. The Cobb County Police were called and the child was subsequently taken to Children's Healthcare of Atlanta where he later died.

Six Flags Railroad
 On May 13, 2018, the train engine caught fire. Two employees were taken to the hospital, and while no park guests were on the ride at the time of the accident, one park guest was treated at the park's medical center and released.
On September 7, 2019, the ride remained closed for inspection after the train engine partially derailed from its track and tipped over. Although none of the passengers on board were injured in the accident, they were evacuated off the cars.

The Riddler Mindbender
On April 22, 1978, a 12-year-old boy injured his right arm when it was caught between one of the cars he was sitting in and loading platform. His father filed a $1 million lawsuit against the park for injuries sustained.
On June 3, 1984, a mechanical problem caused a train to stop abruptly, causing four people to be hospitalized. Following the incident, the ride was repaired and put back into service.

Wheelie
In May 2009, four children became ill when the attraction failed to stop at the end of its cycle. After returning to a horizontal position, a limit switch failed and the ride continued to spin for five to ten minutes. The park's first-aid staff treated the children, while one was transported to an area hospital by his parents; the child was not admitted, however. An investigation determined that the ride operator did not engage an emergency stop switch due to a miscommunication between her and her supervisor; the park's ride operators are trained in how to stop their rides in the event of a malfunction. Since then, additional safety features have been added to ensure that the attraction automatically stops within 15 seconds if the limit switch were to fail.

Z-Force
On July 18, 1989, an 11-year-old boy from Talladega, Alabama, became unconscious while riding Z-Force. Park staff performed CPR, but the victim was pronounced dead after being taken to HCA Parkway Medical Center. An autopsy failed to pinpoint the cause of death.

Six Flags Over Texas

Big Bend
On July 1, 1972, five people were injured, two seriously, after two cars collided. The victims were taken to Memorial Hospital where one person underwent surgery and another was placed in an intensive care ward.
On March 31, 1974, a woman was reported to be in critical condition after being taken to Arlington Memorial Hospital due to her suffering broken ribs, a fractured pelvis and lacerations after falling  from the ride. The attraction closed temporarily for investigation, but park officials failed to find any evidence on what was determined to be the exact cause of the incident about how the woman fell off the train. On July 23, 1974, the victim filed a $250,000 lawsuit to cover medical expenses, lost past and future wages, and for "anguish" caused by a "disfiguring" facial scar.

Butterfield Stagecoach
On May 27, 1967, a 4-year-old girl from Haltom City, Texas was seriously injured when she was pinned by one of the coaches as the right wheel collapsed when it overturned. She was taken to Harris Hospital and had surgery done on both her feet. Ten more people that were on board the ride also suffered injuries in the accident but they were all released from Arlington Memorial Hospital after receiving emergency treatment.

El Sombrero
On August 8, 1968, ride operator John Raymond Nelson approached the ride before it stopped so he could quickly unload the passengers. Nelson lost his balance and fell into the pit beneath the ride. An ambulance later arrived and carried him to Arlington Memorial Hospital, where he was pronounced dead on arrival.

The Gunslinger
On March 12, 2006, ten people suffered minor injuries when the Gunslinger, a Chance Rides Manufacturing "Yo-Yo" attraction, was brought to an abrupt stop and several swing seats collided with each other. Five people were sent to the hospital after complaints of back pain; the others were treated at the on-site first aid station. In October 2008, Chance recalled 85 Yo-Yo rides to repair defects that were found in this accident and one other.

Hurricane Harbor
On September 5, 2011, a 64-year-old woman from Allen, Texas was found unresponsive and drowned in the park's lazy river. She was pulled from the water, taken to Arlington Memorial Hospital's ICU and later died.
On August 9, 2012, six lifeguards suffered minor injuries on the Tornado water slide during a training session. Park officials say it was the result of 'inappropriate horseplay'.
On June 23, 2021, a fight between six and eight people broke out in the parking lot. An off-duty police officer attempted to break up the fight, then a 16-year-old teenager was hit by a gunshot, severely injuring him. He later died at a local hospital.

La Vibora
On May 31, 1995, a 16-year-old park employee suffered injuries after falling from the tracks and was run over by an incoming train.

Mr. Freeze

On April 10, 2022, at around 6:30 pm, several guests were evacuated from the ride's surrounding area when an electrical malfunction caused smoke to spread around its interior. Five people were treated at the scene for smoke inhalation while seven were taken to a local hospital for further evaluation.

New Texas Giant

On July 19, 2013, a 52-year-old woman from Dallas, Texas, fell  to her death while riding the New Texas Giant roller coaster. According to one eyewitness account, the victim – described as overweight – was concerned about being properly secured after boarding the ride. She heard other restraints click three times but only reported hearing hers click once. A ride attendant assured her that as long as she heard a click, it was secure. Some riders informed investigators that the woman was thrown from the roller coaster as it rounded a turn, and one rider tweeted that he saw the restraint come undone. Other eyewitnesses believed the seat restraint remained locked in the lowered position when the train returned to the station. The ride closed for two months during the investigation. The victim was found on top of the metal roof of one of the coaster tunnels, near the Music Mill Amphitheater. Due to its similarity to Texas Giant, Iron Rattler was closed temporarily by Six Flags Fiesta Texas following the incident. It reopened almost a month later with added seat belts. Representatives from Gerstlauer, the German company that designed and built the ride's trains, participated in the investigation. While Gerstlauer would not discuss any specifics, they released a statement saying their restraint system could not open while the ride was in motion. The investigation was completed on September 10, 2013, and Texas Giant reopened on September 14, 2013. Each train's restraint system was modified, seat belts were added, and a seat replica was placed at the entrance allowing riders to test before waiting in line. The woman's family filed lawsuits against both the park and manufacturer, both of which blamed and sued each other for the accident. On November 18, 2014, attorneys for the victim's family announced that they had reached an undisclosed settlement with both Six Flags and Gerstlauer, with a spokesperson saying the family "is very pleased with the settlement and appreciates the condolences offered by Six Flags and Gerstlauer".

Other incidents involving guests
On March 19, 2021, a group of teenagers started a riot outside the amusement park as one person shot another in the arm. Other people were injured in the immediate aftermath when the incident took place as they ran away on foot with some frantically running towards the park exit amid panicked screams. Some also hopped fences and ducked underneath counters for safety and a large group of people hid inside a building, packed close together. The suspected shooter was arrested by the police and also charged with aggravated assault. The victim who was shot suffered non-life-threatening injuries sustained when leaving the park.
On September 11, 2021, multiple fights broke out which prompted the park to close 30 minutes early as a precautionary measure. An 18-year-old man was arrested at the scene as he faced criminal charges.

Roaring Rapids
On March 21, 1999, 28-year-old Valeria Cartwright of West Helena, Arkansas was killed and ten other guests were injured, when the raft they were on overturned in 2–3 feet of water due to sudden deflation of the air chambers that support the raft. The raft then became caught on an underwater pipe, which provided leverage for the rushing water in the ride to flip the boat over. In a subsequent settlement, Six Flags agreed to pay US$4 million to the victim's family, and the company said it would join the family in a lawsuit against Canyon Manufacturing Co., the company responsible for parts that were related to the accident.

Runaway Mine Train
On August 9, 1973, ten people suffered minor injuries when two cars from a coaster train derailed as it was running through a tunnel. All were treated at Arlington Memorial Hospital and released.

Shock Wave
On August 31, 1980, Jamie Pratt, a 17-year-old female park employee from Irving, Texas was reported to be in serious, but stable condition at Arlington Memorial Hospital after falling  from the coaster during its routine test run. She was on the first car from the coaster train accompanied by another park employee, but due to her safety bar not being lowered down and fully restrained properly, she fell into a grassy area below the tracks at the ride's lowest point after the train went through its vertical loops and drops. Park officials temporarily shut down the coaster for thorough inspection.

Texas Chute Out
On July 12, 1976, two girls were left stranded on the ride for more than an hour. The incident was caused by a sudden gust of wind tilting the chute once it began its descent by altering its speed, triggering a safety brake on its cable.

Titan
On July 18, 2001, 30 passengers were stranded in 90-degree heat after the computer sensor system automatically shut the ride down as one of the trains from the coaster was stuck  on its incline. Passengers were eventually rescued about an hour later as a park worker helped evacuate all of them safely by walking down the catwalk on the side of its tracks.

Six Flags St. Louis

Boomerang
 On May 6, 2016, the Boomerang came to an abrupt halt. The park was closed at the time, but groups of high school students were at the park on field trips. Four students suffered minor injuries, but were able to get off the ride. Three of the students were taken to a nearby hospital as a precautionary measure, though no one was seriously injured.

Mr. Freeze: Reverse Blast
On June 1, 1998, twenty passengers had to be evacuated off the ride after the train suddenly stopped on its tracks. When the ride was temporarily shut down, employees fully inspected it and a park spokesperson claimed that it was found to be operating normally. The ride reopened the next day.

River King Mine Train / Rail Blazer
On July 7, 1984, a 46-year-old woman from Indianapolis, Indiana was riding the Rail Blazer roller coaster when she was flung from the ride and fell  to her death.  Park officials claimed that the woman fainted and fell out of the car, but her husband, who had been beside her, said that she had not fainted but had simply been tossed from the ride when it whipped around a curve.  At the time, the ride was only the third stand-up roller coaster in the world, but following this incident it was converted back to a sit-down coaster.

Screamin' Eagle
On September 18, 1976, 19 people suffered minor injuries after a coaster train collided into the other that was parked at the station. Sixteen of them were treated at the park's first aid medical center while three were taken to the hospital for further examination.

Skyway
On July 26, 1978, a man and two of his three nieces who were riding with him died when their gondola fell from the cable. Firefighters were called to the park to rescue the occupants of those cars. A park spokesman claimed that the car simply "dropped off" its cable.

Typhoon Twister
On June 24, 2018, there were two separate incidents on the attraction - one involving a 27-year-old man from St. Louis, and the other a woman from Lebanon, Missouri. In both cases, the guests fell out of rafts while riding, and were taken to the hospital due to undisclosed injuries. Park management closed the ride for inspection following the pair of incidents, per standard procedure.

Other incidents involving guests
On June 13, 2018, a 23-year-old man from Caseyville, Illinois hit and pushed an employee, who was dressed as Daffy Duck. He was soon arrested and charged with assault.

Six Flags White Water

Hurricane Harbor
On March 6, 2016, two individuals broke into the park, went past three fences, and skateboarded down the Tornado water slide as a half pipe. They were arrested on felony charges of criminal damage to property, having caused an estimated $20,000 in damages to the fiberglass coating covering the slide.

Maintenance building
On July 11, 2010, a fire broke out in a maintenance building during operating hours, forcing the evacuation and closure of the park. The fire was contained to a single building, located adjacent to the park's wave pool and used principally for storage. Spokespeople for the water park and for the Cobb County fire department noted that everyone was evacuated safely and that there were no reported injuries. The park re-opened two days later on July 13 after crews had sealed off the damaged area caused by the fire.

Former properties

Six Flags Elitch Gardens

Six Flags Kentucky Kingdom

Six Flags Worlds of Adventure

See also
Amusement park accidents

References

Six Flags
Six Flags
Six Flags
Death-related lists
Health-related lists